Valentin Savitskiy (born ) is a Russian male  track cyclist. He competed in the sprint event and keirin event at the 2013 and 2014 UCI Track Cycling World Championships.

References

External links
 Profile at cyclingarchives.com

1984 births
Living people
Russian track cyclists
Russian male cyclists
Place of birth missing (living people)
21st-century Russian people